Sindhi Bhil, is an Indo-Aryan dialect spoken in the Pakistani province of Sindh, as well as some parts of Balochistan.  Sindhi Bhil is often referred as a Sindhi dialect than a language alongside Lasi.

Characteristics 
Sindhi Bhil is known to have many old Sindhi words, which were lost after Arabic, Persian, and Chaghatai words were absorbed into Sindhi.  Sindhi Bhil's Badin dialect is most closest to Sindhi.  The Mohrano speakers have added many Dhatki words into their language, and some say the Mohrano dialect of Sindhi Bhil may be considered a different language due to the amount of Dhatki loanwords.

Speakers 

The Meghwar Bhil are the speakers of Sindhi Bhil and are Hindu and number around 86,500.  They live in Balochistan and Sindh, while there are diasporas in Gujarat and Delhi in India due to the Partition of India.  They are part of the Bhil people.

Dialects 
Sindhi Bhil has four dialects.  The most spoken is Badin which has around 10,000 speakers.  It is spoken in the city of Badin and also Matli.  Other dialects include Mohrano, Nuclear Sindhi Bhil, and Sindhi Meghwar.  Mohrano is spoken in Tando Allahyar.

See also 
 |سنڌي_ڀيل_ٻولي (Sindhi Bhil in Sindhi language)

References 

Sindhi language
Northwestern Indo-Aryan languages
Languages of Sindh